The Henry F. Hall Building is a building on the Sir George Williams Campus of Concordia University in Montreal, Quebec, Canada. It is located at 1455 de Maisonneuve Boulevard West, in between Mackay Street and Bishop Street in the Quartier Concordia neighbourhood.

History

The building is named for Henry Foss Hall, president of Sir George Williams University from 1956 to 1962.

It was designed by architecture firm Ross, Fish, Duschenes and Barrett, which hired James A. M. K. O'Beirne, to draw up the plans. It was inaugurated on 14 October 1966, the very same day as the Montreal Metro.

In 1994-95, the building's exterior, having been damaged by pollution and the elements over the decades, was cleaned and re-painted.

It was the scene of the Sir George Williams Computer Riot in 1969, the Concordia University Massacre in 1992 and the Concordia University Netanyahu Riot in 2002.

References

University and college buildings completed in 1966
Concordia University buildings and structures
Sir George Williams University
1966 establishments in Quebec
Universities and colleges founded by the YMCA